The discography of Japanese band Ego-Wrappin' includes nine studio albums, two compilation albums, seven extended plays and nine singles. Ego-Wrappin' was formed in 1996, and originally released music through independent labels Metro Crew Records and RD Records, while later distributing through Universal Music Japan and Toy's Factory.

Discography

Studio albums

Extended plays

Compilation albums

Singles

As lead artist

As featured artist

Promotional singles

Video albums

Guest appearances

Notes

References 

Discographies of Japanese artists
Jazz discographies
Rock music group discographies